Isa is a town and Local Government Area of Sokoto state, Nigeria. It shares borders with Shinkafi in Zamfara State, Goronyo and Sabon Birni from west and north respectively in Sokoto and the Republic of Niger in the east.

It has an area of 2,158 km and a population of 146,103 at the 2006 census.

The postal code of the area is 842.

The Isa LGA is made up of the capital town of Isa and other towns and villages such as Turba, Bafarawa (birthplace of former Sokoto State governor and 2007 presidential candidate Attahiru Bafarawa). Historically, the area was a part of the ancient kingdom of Gobir and is inhabited by members of the Gobirawa and Fulani ethnic groups.

References

Local Government Areas in Sokoto State